Raiders of the West is a 1942 American Western film directed by Sam Newfield and written by Oliver Drake. The film stars Bill Boyd, Art Davis, Lee Powell, Virginia Carroll, Charles King and Glenn Strange. The film was released on February 20, 1942, by Producers Releasing Corporation.

Plot

Cast          
Bill Boyd as Bill Boyd
Art Davis as Art Davis
Lee Powell as Lee Powell
Virginia Carroll as Lola Andre
Charles King as Duke Mallory
Glenn Strange as Hank Reynolds
Rex Lease as Pete
Slim Whitaker as Sheriff
Milton Kibbee as Justice
Lynton Brent as Morton 
Dale Sherwood as Blanche

References

External links
 

1942 films
American Western (genre) films
1942 Western (genre) films
Producers Releasing Corporation films
Films directed by Sam Newfield
American black-and-white films
1940s English-language films
1940s American films